Varvara Fasoi (born 2 February 1991) is a Greek cyclist, who most recently rode for UCI Women's Continental Team . She competed at the UCI Road World Championships on five occasions between 2014 and 2019.

Major results

Road
Source: 

2007
 National Novices Road Championships
3rd Road race
3rd Time trial
2008
 National Junior Road Championships
2nd Time trial
3rd Road race
2011
 3rd Road race, National Road Championships
2012
 3rd Road race, National Road Championships
2013
 National Road Championships
3rd Road race
3rd Time trial
2014
 National Road Championships
1st  Road race
3rd Time trial
2015
 National Road Championships
1st  Time trial
2nd Road race
2016
 National Road Championships
1st  Road race
2nd Time trial
2017
 National Road Championships
2nd Road race
2nd Time trial
2018
 National Road Championships
1st  Time trial
2nd Road race
 5th Time trial, Mediterranean Games
2019
 2nd Road race, National Road Championships
 6th Tour of Arava
2020
 National Road Championships
1st  Time trial
2nd Road race
2021
 1st  Road race, National Road Championships
2022
 National Road Championships
1st  Road race
2nd Time trial
 9th Road race, Mediterranean Games

Track

2006
 National Novices Track Championships
3rd Individual pursuit
3rd 500m time trial
2014
 National Track Championships
1st  500m time trial
2nd Scratch
2015
 National Track Championships
2nd 500m time trial
2nd Scratch
2nd Individual pursuit
2016
 National Track Championships
2nd 500m time trial
3rd Keirin
3rd Individual pursuit
2018
 National Track Championships
1st  Individual pursuit
2nd 500m time trial
2020
 3rd Individual pursuit, National Track Championships

Mountain biking

2006
 3rd Cross-country, National Novices Mountain Bike Championships
2015
 National Mountain Bike Championships
1st  Cross-country marathon
1st  Cross-country
 1st Cross-country, Sfendami
 1st Cross-country marathon, Sfendami
 3rd Chalkidiki Mountainbike
 3rd Naousa Mountainbike
2016
 1st Lamia Mountainbike
 2nd  Cross-country eliminator, Balkan Mountain Bike Championships
 2nd Polonezköy Mountainbike
2017
 1st Alterbiketours Tours Sparti Peter and Pauls
2020
 1st  Cross-country, National Mountain Bike Championships
2021
 1st  Cross-country, National Mountain Bike Championships
2022
 National Mountain Bike Championships
2nd Cross-country
3rd Cross-country marathon

References

External links
 
 

1991 births
Greek female cyclists
Living people
Place of birth missing (living people)
Cyclists at the 2015 European Games
European Games competitors for Greece
Cyclists at the 2019 European Games
21st-century Greek women